Fredrick Bwino Kyakulaga (born in June 22, 1964) is a Ugandan Microbiologist and Politician who serves as the State Minister for Agriculture, Animal Industry, and Fisheries, a position he assumed in June 2021. He is also the elected Member of Parliament for Kigulu North in Iganga District on National Resistance Movement ticket.

Personal Life and Education 
Fred Bwino Kyakulaga was born in June 22, 1964 in Kigulu, Iganga District.

Fred Holds a Phd in Public Administration from the Uganda Management Institute, MA in Procurement from Makerere University and currently doing his Phd in Agricultural Research in Plant Pathology Microbiology.

See also 

 List of Government Ministries of Uganda
 List of Members of the Eleventh Parliament of Uganda
 List of Members of the Tenth Parliament of Uganda

References

External Websites 

 Ministry of Agriculture, Animal Industry and Fisheries Website
 FAO Website

Living people
1964 births
Active politicians
Makerere University alumni
Uganda Management Institute alumni